Fort Zeelandia is a fortress in Paramaribo, Suriname. In 1640 the French built a wooden fort on the spot, which during the British colonial days was reinforced and became Fort Willoughby. It was taken by the Dutch in 1667 and renamed Fort Zeelandia.

History
Surinam, a small Dutch colony was established in 1650 by Major Anthony Rowse on behalf of the governor of Barbados, Francis Willoughby. In 1651 the English reinforced the abandoned French fort near present-day Paramaribo, calling it Fort Willoughby. In 1667 the Dutch Admiral Abraham Crijnssen took Paramaribo from forces under Lieutenant-Governor William Byam in a battle which lasted only three hours as British munitions were exhausted. Crijnssen also recaptured the Essequibo-Pomeroon Colony Crijnssen renamed the Surinamese fort to Zeelandia. Over the years, it started to become obsolete as a military object and in 1772, there were even plans to tear it down.

After the Surinamese independence in 1975, during the military government of Dési Bouterse in the 1980s, Fort Zeelandia was the location of the "December murders" of 1982 and was used to hold and torture political prisoners.

The Surinamese Museum is located in Fort Zeelandia. The museum has a large collection of ethnographica. Its collections contain archeology, visual arts, colonial furniture, textiles, and historical photos.

The Nola Hatterman Art Academy is located in the former commander's house.

See also
Fort Nieuw-Amsterdam

References

External links
 Fort Zeelandia at the City of Paramaribo
 Surinamese Museum (in Dutch)

Buildings and structures completed in 1651
Zeelandia
Buildings and structures in Paramaribo
History of Suriname
Tourist attractions in Suriname
1651 establishments in the Dutch Empire